The 2012 Morocco Tennis Tour – Meknes was a professional tennis tournament played on clay courts. It was the fifth edition of the tournament which was part of the 2012 ATP Challenger Tour. It took place in Meknes, Morocco between 20 and 26 February 2012.

Singles main-draw entrants

Seeds

 1 Rankings are as of February 13, 2012.

Other entrants
The following players received wildcards into the singles main draw:
  Omar Erramy
  Yassine Idmbarek
  Reda Karakhi
  Younès Rachidi

The following players received entry from the qualifying draw:
  Alberto Brizzi
  Marcin Gawron
  Gerard Granollers
  Bastian Knittel

Champions

Singles

 Evgeny Donskoy def.  Adrian Ungur, 6–1, 6–3

Doubles

 Adrián Menéndez /  Jaroslav Pospíšil vs.  Gerard Granollers /  Iván Navarro, 6–3, 3–6, [10–8]

External links
Official Website
ITF Search
ATP official site

Morocco Tennis Tour – Meknes
Meknes